Dale G. Stephens (born November 23, 1959, in Huntington, West Virginia) is an American politician and a Democratic member of the West Virginia House of Delegates representing District 17 since January 12, 2013. Stephens served consecutively from January 2005 until January 2013 and non-consecutively from January 2001 until January 2003 in a District 16 seat.

Education
Stephens earned his BS from Marshall University.

Elections
2012 Redistricted to District 17 along with fellow District 16 Representative Doug Reynolds, Stephens placed first in the three-way May 8, 2012 Democratic Primary with 2,280 votes (43.1%), and placed second in the four-way two-position November 6, 2012 General election with 6,559 votes (30.0%) behind Representative Stephens (D) and ahead of Republican nominees Michael Ankrom and Joyce Holland.
2000 When Representative Evan Jenkins ran for West Virginia Senate and left a district seat open, Stephens placed in the four-way 2000 Democratic Primary and was elected in the five-way three-position November 7, 2000 General election with incumbent Representatives Susan Hubbard (D) and Jody Smirl (R).
2002 Stephens placed in the seven-way 2002 Democratic Primary but lost the six-way three-position November 5, 2002 General election which re-elected Representative Smirl (R) and Republican nominees Greg Howard and Kelli Sobonya, unseating Representatives Hubbard (D) and Stephens (D).
2004 When Representative Smirl left the Legislature and left a district seat open, Stephens placed in the six-way 2004 Democratic Primary, and was re-elected in the six-way three-position November 2, 2004 General election with incumbents Howard (R) and Sobonya (R).
2006 Stephens placed in the four-way 2006 Democratic Primary and was elected in the six-way three-position November 7, 2006 General election along with incumbent Representatives Sobonya (R) and fellow Democratic nominee Doug Reynolds, and unseating Representative Howard (R).
2008 Stephens placed second in the five-way May 13, 2008 Democratic Primary with 5,382 votes (24.5%), and placed third in the four-way three-position November 4, 2008 General election with 11,482 votes (25.2%) behind of Representatives Reynolds (D) and Sobonya (R) and ahead of Democratic nominee Amy Herrenkohl.
2010 Stephens and Representative Reynolds were unopposed for the May 11, 2010 Democratic Primary where Stephens placed first with 3,292 votes (52.8%); and placed third in the four-way three-position November 2, 2010 General election with 8,074 votes (24.0%) behind Representatives Sobonya (R) and Reynolds (D), and ahead of Republican nominee Tomma Anne See.

References

External links
Official page at the West Virginia Legislature

Dale Stephens at Ballotpedia
Dale Stephens at the National Institute on Money in State Politics

1959 births
Living people
Marshall University alumni
Democratic Party members of the West Virginia House of Delegates
Politicians from Huntington, West Virginia